Keezhkulam is a panchayat town in Kanniyakumari district in the India state of Tamil Nadu.

Demographics
As of the 2001 India census, Keezhkulam is shown to have a population of 17,352 with 51% of the population male and 49% female. 

According to the information gathered in 2001, Keezhkulam had an average literacy rate of 79%, which is higher than the Indian national average of 59.5%. Male literacy was at 79% and female literacy was at 72%. Also according to the census, 11% of the population was under 6 years of age.

References

Cities and towns in Kanyakumari district